GNOME Panel is a highly configurable taskbar for GNOME. It formed a core part of the desktop in GNOME 1 and GNOME 2. It has been replaced in GNOME 3 by default with GNOME Shell, which only works with the Mutter window manager.

There are many applets for GNOME Panel available in one package called gnome-applets while some applets included with GNOME Panel as built-in, like a traditional start menu.

GNOME Panel served as Fallback Mode until GNOME 3.8 when Mutter could not be executed, then it was replaced with a suite of officially supported GNOME Shell extensions named GNOME Classic. Now it is part of GNOME Flashback, an official session for GNOME 3 which provides a user experience similar to GNOME 2.

In GNOME 3, customizing GNOME Panel is done by pressing the  key while right-clicking on the panel.

Appearance 
By default, GNOME Flashback contains two panels (one on the top, and one to its opposite on the bottom) spanning the width of the screen.

The top panel usually contains navigation menus labeled "Applications" and "Places" in that order, as the "System" menu from GNOME 2.x has been replaced by a control panel in GNOME 3.x. These menus hold links to common applications and areas of the file system, respectively.

A user menu placed on the opposite side of the screen, which has been available since GNOME 2.14 but has become more prominent in GNOME 3.x, holds access to account and system settings as well as options to log out, switch user, and shut down the computer.

The top panel usually contains a clock/calendar and a notification area, which can double as a sort of dock, as well. The bottom panel is commonly empty by default (other than a set of buttons to navigate between desktops) due to its use in the navigation between windows (windows minimize to the bottom panel by default).

Customization 

Users can populate these panels with other completely customizable menus and buttons, including new menus, search boxes, and icons, with the icons in particular (called launchers) performing functions similar to the quick-launch feature found in the Microsoft Windows 98–Vista taskbar. GNOME 2.x accomplishes this via right-clicking on an applet and selecting options from a menu; in GNOME 3.x, one must press the  key while right-clicking to attain the same functionality.

Other applications can also be attached to the panels, and the panels are highly reconfigurable: anything on these panels can be moved, removed, or configured in other ways. For example, a migrating Microsoft Windows user might move the menus usually positioned in the top panel into a 'start' menu on the bottom panel as well as moving the notification area into the place normally positioned by the Windows notification area, then remove the top panel altogether, to interact with GNOME Panel similarly to the Windows taskbar.

The version of GNOME Panel available in the repository for Ubuntu 12.04 offers a modified version of Fallback Mode with the addition of a custom theme and ports of Ubuntu's own Indicators from their old GNOME 2.x desktop. Trisquel uses Fallback Mode (Flashback) for its main desktop, because GNOME Shell requires 3D acceleration as it relies on graphics composition, while some free software drivers do not support 3D acceleration, among other reasons like more usability and more stability.

See also 

 MATE (software)
 Xfce

References

External links 
 GNOME Panel changelog

Application launchers
Free software programmed in C
GNOME Applications
Graphical shells that use GTK